Daihi Susumu (born 16 October 1952 as Susumu Ogura) is a former sumo wrestler from Nagoya, Aichi, Japan.

Career
He made his professional debut in March 1968, and reached the top division in January 1977. His highest rank was maegashira 2. For much of his active career he was known under the shikona of Onobori, before switching to Daihi in 1978.

Retirement from sumo

He retired in May 1983 and became an elder in the Japan Sumo Association under the name  Yamahibiki and coached at Oyama stable. In April 1986 his old stablemaster (ex-ōzeki Matsunobori) died and Daihi took over the stable and the Oyama name. The stable was shut down in June 1986 and he became a coach at Takasago stable. He was involved in expanding the number of official sumo techniques from 70 to 82 in 2000, the first major changes for 40 years. He moved to the now defunct Azumazeki stable in December 2011. He reached the retirement age for elders of 65 in October 2017, but stayed with the Sumo Association for an additional five years as a consultant. In February 2020 he moved to the Hakkaku stable. The Japan Sumo Association announced his retirement effective August 31, 2022, slightly ahead of his 70th birthday.

Fighting style
Daihi preferred grappling techniques (yotsu-sumo). His favoured grip on his opponent’s mawashi was hidari-yotsu, a right hand outside, left hand inside position. His most common winning kimarite were yori-kiri (force out) and uwatenage (outer arm throw).

Career record

See also
Glossary of sumo terms
List of past sumo wrestlers
List of sumo elders

References

1952 births
Living people
Japanese sumo wrestlers
Sumo people from Aichi Prefecture
Sportspeople from Nagoya